This is a list of fellows of the Royal Society elected in 1986.

Fellows of the Royal Society

Adrian Edmund Gill  (1937–1986)
Thomas Nelson Marsham  (1923–1989)
Allan Charles Wilson  (1934–1991)
Dennis Chapman  (1927–1999)
Michael Smith  (1932–2000)
Nicholas Harold Lloyd Ridley  (1906–2001)
Vulimiri Ramalingaswami  (1921–2001)
John Marmion Edmond  (1943–2001)
Sir William Mitchell  (1925–2002)
John Argyris  (1916–2004)
Gordon Richard Wray  (1928–2005)
Michael Augustine Raftery  (1936–2007)
Peter Berners Fellgett  (1936–2008)
Sir William Ian Axford  (1933–2010)
Sir Gabriel Horn  (1927–2012)
Martin Fleischmann  (1927–2012)
Sir Roy Malcolm Anderson
Sir Alec Broers, Baron Broers
Geoffrey Burnstock (1929–2020)
John Clarke
Peter Day
Richard Newland Dixon
Simon Kirwan Donaldson
John Derek Dowell
Charon Robin Ganellin
John Rodney Guest
Werner Israel
Sir Alec Jeffreys
Allen Kerr
Chris J. Leaver
George Huntly Lorimer
Robert Hall Michell
Henry Keith Moffatt
Peter Damian Richardson
Raymond Edward Smallman
Charles James Matthew Stirling
Sir John Sulston
Dame Jean Olwen Thomas
Sir David James Wallace
Elizabeth Kerr Warrington

Foreign members

 Piet Borst
 Albert Jakob Eschenmoser
Antonio Garcia-Bellido
Joseph Bishop Keller
Edwin Herbert Land  (1909–1991)
 Shosaku Numa  (1929–1992)

Elected under Statute 12
Roger Makins, 1st Baron Sherfield (1904–1996)

References

1986
1986 in science
1986 in the United Kingdom